Xiaoyu Luo  (born 1960) is a Chinese and British applied mathematician who studies biomechanics, fluid dynamics, and the interactions of fluid flows with soft biological tissues. She is a professor of applied mathematics at the University of Glasgow.

Education and career
Luo was born in the UK but grew up in Xi'an in a family of artists. After earning bachelor's and master's degrees in theoretical mechanics at Xi'an Jiaotong University, in 1982 and 1985 respectively, she became a lecturer at Xi'an Jiaotong University. There, she studied for a Ph.D. from 1987 until 1990, with a visit to the UK through a joint doctoral program with the University of Sheffield. When she earned her Ph.D. at Xi'an Jiaotong University in 1990, she became the first woman to do so.

She moved to the UK in 1992 to become a postdoctoral researcher at the University of Leeds. She worked as a lecturer in engineering at Queen Mary and Westfield College from 1997 to 2000, and in mechanical engineering at the University of Sheffield from 2000 to 2004, before becoming a senior lecturer in mathematics at the University of Glasgow in 2005. She was promoted to professor in 2008, the first female professor of applied mathematics at Glasgow.

In 2014 she was named a chair professor at Northwestern Polytechnical University in Xi'an. She has also been a visitor to the International Center for Applied Mechanics at Xi'an Jiaotong University.

Recognition
Luo became a Fellow of the Institution of Mechanical Engineers in 2004 and a Fellow of the Royal Society of Edinburgh in 2014.

References

External links
Home page

1960 births
Living people
British mathematicians
British women mathematicians
Chinese mathematicians
Chinese women mathematicians
Applied mathematicians
Xi'an Jiaotong University alumni
Academic staff of Xi'an Jiaotong University
Academics of Queen Mary University of London
Academics of the University of Sheffield
Academics of the University of Glasgow
Academic staff of the Northwestern Polytechnical University
Fellows of the Institution of Mechanical Engineers
Fellows of the Royal Society of Edinburgh